Mark Alburger (born  April 2, 1957 in Upper Darby, Pennsylvania) is a San Francisco Bay area composer and conductor.  He is the founder and music director of the San Francisco Composers Chamber Orchestra, as well as  the music director of Goat Hall Productions / San Francisco Cabaret Opera. Alburger is also the editor-publisher of 21st-Century Music Journal, which he founded in 1994 as 20th-Century Music.

Biography 
Alburger studied composition with Gerald Levinson and Joan Panetti at Swarthmore College; Jules Langert at Dominican University of California; and Roland Jackson, Thomas Flaherty, and Christopher Yavelow at Claremont Graduate University, where he was awarded a Ph.D. in Musicology in 1996. He also studied privately thereafter with Terry Riley. Alburger is best known for his use of troping techniques, combining structures and musical passages from a wide variety of pre-existing works across cultures and eras. He has a large opus list, including many concerti, operas, song cycles, symphonies, and a thirteen-hour theatrical setting of the Bible.

As a music journalist, he has published interviews with many notable composers across the new music scene, including Henry Brant, Earle Brown, George Crumb, Anthony Davis, Paul Dresher, Philip Glass, Ali Akbar Khan, Joan La Barbara, Steve Mackey, Tod Machover, Meredith Monk, Pauline Oliveros, Steve Reich, Erling Wold, Christian Wolff, and Pamela Z, and is a contributor to The New Grove Dictionary of Music and Musicians.

Dr. Alburger currently resides in northern California with his partner Harriet March Page, a mezzo-soprano and artistic director of Goat Hall Productions / San Francisco Cabaret Opera.

References

External links 

1957 births
Living people
20th-century classical composers
21st-century classical composers
American male classical composers
American classical composers
People from Upper Darby Township, Pennsylvania
21st-century American composers
20th-century American composers
Classical musicians from Pennsylvania
20th-century American male musicians
21st-century American male musicians